Jim Noble may refer to:

People
Jim Noble, singer/songwriter of Tortilla Army
Jim Noble (screenwriter), see List of K-9 episodes
Jim Noble (racing driver), see 1988 American Racing Series season
Jim Noble (pit reporter), NASCAR pit reporter for the Performance Racing Network and ESPN 
Jim Noble (American football), see List of Buffalo Bisons (NFL) players

Fictional characters
Jim Noble, character in Redemption (1990 novel)
Jimmy Noble, character in Day of the Evil Gun

See also
James Noble (disambiguation)